Edward Patrick Gharrity (March 13, 1892 – October 10, 1966) was an American professional baseball player and coach.

Life

Primarily a catcher in Major League Baseball, he also played first base and the outfield for the Washington Senators from  through , appearing in 671 games over an eight-year period. Gharrity coached under Johnson again from 1933 to 1935 when "The Big Train" was manager of the Cleveland Indians.

He died at age 74 in Beloit, Wisconsin.

See also
List of Major League Baseball players who spent their entire career with one franchise

External links

1892 births
1966 deaths
Major League Baseball catchers
Baseball players from Iowa
People from Iowa County, Iowa
Washington Senators (1901–1960) players
Cleveland Indians coaches
Washington Senators (1901–1960) coaches
Minneapolis Millers (baseball) players
Dayton Veterans players
Eau Claire Bears players
Minor league baseball managers
Burials in Wisconsin